Haupia is a traditional coconut milk-based Hawaiian dessert often found at luaus and other local gatherings in Hawaii. Since the 1940s, it has become popular as a topping for white cake, especially at weddings. Although technically considered a pudding, the consistency of haupia closely approximates gelatin dessert, and it is usually served in blocks like gelatin. It is also served in local ice cream parlors as Haupia Ice Cream.

History
The traditional Hawaiian recipe for haupia calls for heated coconut milk to be mixed with ground pia (Polynesian arrowroot, Tacca leontopetaloides) until the mixture thickens. Due to the lack of availability of arrowroot starch, some modern recipes for haupia substitute cornstarch.

Haupia is very similar to the European dessert blancmange.

In the typical modern recipe, diluted coconut milk, sugar, and salt are mixed with arrowroot or cornstarch and heated until thickened and smooth, then poured into a rectangular pan and chilled with gelatin. It is traditionally cut into small blocks and served on squares of ti leaf or plain.

A popular variation is haupia pie, where the haupia is set in a crust as one layer, then usually accompanied by another layer of either chocolate or purple sweet potato. 

Some coconut dessert recipes call for unflavored gelatin in place of the cornstarch, but it would be erroneous to call them haupia. Many local confections that contain coconut or coconut flavoring are advertised as haupia flavored.  Currently, McDonald's across Hawaii sell "Haupia Pies," similar to their better-known apple pies.

See also

 Coconut bar
 Maja blanca
 Nata de coco
 Rēti'a
 Tembleque

References
 .

Notes

External links
 Kau Kau Kitchen column on Haupia
traditional Hawaiian haupia recipe.

Puddings
Hawaiian cuisine
Hawaiian desserts
Foods containing coconut